Chauvenet may refer to:

People
Enrico Rossi Chauvenet (born 1984) Italian footballer
Russ Chauvenet (1920–2003), chess champion and founder of science fiction fandom
William Chauvenet (1820–1870), American mathematician and educator

Other uses
Chauvenet (crater), lunar crater
Chauvenet Prize, award for mathematical expository writing
Chauvenet's criterion, means of assessing whether a data point is flawed
Mount Chauvenet, mountain in Wyoming, United States
USS Chauvenet (AGS-11), United States naval vessel
USNS Chauvenet (T-AGS-29), United States naval vessel